The Council of Deputies is a constitutional body in Samoa. Its members serve as Deputy O le Ao o le Malo and act as head of state when the O le Ao o le Malo is unable to fulfill their duties due to absence or incapacitation.

The Council was established by the constitution at independence on 1 January 1962. It consists of between one and three members, who are elected by the Legislative Assembly. If there are no members, the Chief Justice acts in their place. Elections to the Council are required to take place as soon as possible after a new O le Ao o le Malo is elected.

Members
Tuiaana Tuimaleali'ifano Suatipatipa II (1962–1974)
Tupua Tamasese Lealofi IV (1968–1970, 1976–1983)
Mata'afa Puela Faasuamaleaui Patu
Va'aletoa Sualauvi II (1993–2001, 2004–2017)
Faumuina Anapapa (2002–2006) 
Tufuga Efi (2004–2007)
Tuiloma Pule Lameko (2016–2018)
Le Mamea Ropati (2016–)

References

Government of Samoa
1962 establishments in Western Samoa